Many American sports team names and mascots are based upon or use religious symbolism. The majority are scholastic teams at institutions founded by various denominations of Christianity, both Catholic and Protestant. Saints is the most popular of these names not only at religious schools but public schools. However, the latter are often indirect, the schools being located in places named for saints. The only team name that has become controversial is Crusaders, many having changed in recent years. The term, once associated with protectors of the faith is now also associated with oppression. Many Christian schools use "Knights" as their team names with imagery similar to crusaders, but it is difficult to establish religious symbolism in these cases. There are also a number of teams whose name includes demons or devils, which are mythological creatures from many cultures. However, the devil imagery in sports used by professional sports teams as well as public and non-sectarian schools are an example of the Devil in the arts and popular culture more than religion. There are also a few team identities based upon Norse mythology in popular culture.

Sports mascots and social identity 
Team names and their associated sports mascots are examples of totems in the social sciences; symbols that serve both social and psychological functions with many implicit meanings. The social function is to connect individuals into a community; the psychological function is to symbolize desired qualities with which fans can identify. Mascots are also stereotypes, social constructs which are not always inappropriate when they provide valid, if simplified, perceptions of group differences. Participation in sports either as a player or a fan is a significant determinant of social status for college students, in particular for men.
The most popular category of sports mascots are animals, with Eagles (symbolic of America) at the top of the list followed by Tigers, Bulldogs and Panthers (symbolic of aggression). Of religious meanings, only Saints is in the top 100 in popularity with Catholic, Protestant, and public schools represented. However, many Saints teams currently have a St. Bernard dog as their mascot, often portrayed by a costumed performer.

Sectarian schools

Catholic colleges and universities

 College of the Holy Cross, Worcester, Massachusetts - Holy Cross Crusaders
 DePaul University, Chicago, Illinois - The origin of the DePaul Blue Demons dates back to 1907 when the university changed its name from St. Vincent's College. At the time, the athletic teams had red uniforms with a large "D" on the front, the players being called the "D-men," evolving into "Demons." The name change also included the school colors. The mascot is DIBS (Demon in a Blue Suit).
 Providence College, Providence, Rhode Island - Providence Friars
 Saint Joseph's College of Maine, Standish, Maine - Monks, The Monk is a costumed mascot
 University of Saint Thomas, Minneapolis and Saint Paul, Minnesota - Tommies, name refers to St. Thomas Aquinas, costumed mascot is Tommy the Tomcat.
 College of Saint Benedict and Saint John's University, Minnesota - The College of Saint Benedict for women are called the Bennies representing Benedict of Nursia, and Saint John's University for men are called the Johnnies, representing John of Patmos.

Saints (Catholic) 
 Aquinas College, Grand Rapids, Michigan - Mascot is a St. Bernard dog
 Carroll College, Helena, Montana - Mascot is "Halo"", a St. Bernard dog
 College of St. Joseph, Rutland, Vermont - Fighting Saints (Closed due to financial problems in 2019)
 College of St. Scholastica, Duluth, Minnesota - St. Bernard dog used in some fan items
 Emmanuel College, Boston, Massachusetts - Mascot is "Halo", a St. Bernard dog
 Holy Cross College, Notre Dame, Indiana - Mascot is "Basil", a St. Bernard dog
 Marymount University, Arlington, Virginia - mascot is "Bernie" the Dog
 Maryville University, Town and Country, Missouri - Maryville Saints, mascot "Louis" the St. Bernard
 Mercyhurst North East, North East, Pennsylvania
 Our Lady of the Lake University, San Antonio, Texas - Logos include halos and angel wings.
 Saint Martin's University, Lacey, Washington - Saint Martin's Saints, logo is a knight's helmet
 Siena College, Loudonville, New York - Siena Saints, mascot Bernie "Saint" Bernard
 Siena Heights University, Adrian, Michigan - mascot is "Halo the Husky Dog"
 Thomas More College, Crestview Hills, Kentucky - mascot "Tommy Mo," or "Tommy Moria," a Renaissance Englishman in motley parachute pants.

Catholic K-12 schools
 Archbishop Bergan High School, Fremont, Nebraska - Knights, School logo includes a cross
 Archbishop Williams High School, Braintree, Massachusetts – Bishops
 Bishop England High School, Charleston, South Carolina - Battling Bishops
 Mount Michael Benedictine Abbey and High School, Elkhorn, Nebraska - Knights, School logo is a Benedictine cross
 Sacred Heart Academy, Louisville, Kentucky - Valkyries
 St. Bernard's High School, Fitchburg, Massachusetts – Bernardians
 St. Pius X HIgh School, Albuquerque, New Mexico - Sartans is a reference to the school's namesake.
 Shanley High School, Fargo, North Dakota - Deacons
 Thomas More Prep-Marian, Hays, Kansas - Monarchs, Logo includes a cross

Crusaders (Catholic) 
 Bishop Fenwick High School, Peabody, Massachusetts
 Brother Martin High School, New Orleans, Louisiana
 Cathedral High School, St. Cloud, Minnesota
 Central Catholic High School, Grand Island, Nebraska
 Kapaun Mt. Carmel Catholic High School, Wichita, Kansas
 Lowell Catholic, Lowell, Massachusetts
 Marian High School, Omaha, Nebraska
 Catholic Memorial High School, Waukesha, Wisconsin

Friars 
 Archbishop Curley High School, Baltimore, Maryland
 Austin Catholic Preparatory School, Detroit, Michigan(Closed 1978)
 Bishop Lynch High School, Dallas, Texas
 Fenwick High School, Oak Park, Illinois
 Malvern Preparatory School, Malvern, Pennsylvania
 Monsignor Bonner High School, Drexel Hill, Pennsylvania
 St. Anthony High School, Jersey City, New Jersey
 St. Anthony High School, South Huntington, New York
 Servite High School, Anaheim, California

Saints (Catholic K-12) 
 Bishop Dwenger High School, Fort Wayne, Indiana
 Canterbury School, New Milford, Connecticut
 Central Catholic High School, Bloomington, Illinois
 DeSales High School, Geneva, New York
 Mormon Trail Jr./Sr. High School, Humeston, Iowa
 Notre Dame Preparatory High School, Scottsdale, Arizona, mascot St. Bernard
 San Juan Diego Catholic High School, Austin, Texas
 Santa Clara High School, Oxnard, California
 St. Anthony High School, Long Beach, California
 St. Augustine High School, San Diego, California
 Saint Bernard School, Uncasville, Connecticut
 St. Bernard's High School, Fitchburg, Massachusetts
 St. Bernard Preparatory School, Cullman, Alabama
 Saint Dominic Academy, Auburn and Lewiston, Maine
 St. Louis Catholic High School, Lake Charles, Louisiana
 St. Mary's Central High School, Bismarck, North Dakota
 St. Mary's High School, Annapolis, Maryland
 Saint Mary High School, Westfield, Massachusetts
 St. Mary's School for the Deaf, Buffalo, New York
 St. Patrick's High School, Maysville, Kentucky
 Saint Raphael Academy, Pawtucket, Rhode Island
 St. Thomas Aquinas High School, Overland Park, Kansas
 St. Thomas Aquinas High School, Dover, New Hampshire
 St. Vincent's Academy, Savannah, Georgia
 Saints John Neumann and Maria Goretti Catholic High School, Philadelphia, Pennsylvania
 Saratoga Central Catholic High School, Saratoga Springs, New York
 Seton Catholic Central, Binghamton, New York
 Seton High School, Cincinnati, Ohio
 Tuscarawas Central Catholic High School, New Philadelphia, Ohio
 Xavier College Preparatory High School, Palm Desert, California
 Xavier High School, Cedar Rapids, Iowa

Protestant colleges and universities

 Earlham College, Richmond, Indiana - Quakers, costumed mascot is "Big Earl"
 Eureka College, Eureka, Illinois - Red Devils, imagery includes a devil's head and a pitchfork. Ronald Reagan was an alumnus, playing on the football team.
 Guilford College, Greensboro, North Carolina - Guilford Quakers, mascot "Nathan the Quaker"
 Ohio Wesleyan, Delaware, Ohio - Battling Bishops was selected in 1925 as the team nickname in a contest sponsored by the journalism fraternity.
 Limestone College, Gaffney, South Carolina - Limestone Saints, mascot "Bernie De' Saint", as St. Bernard dog.
 Meredith College, Raleigh, North Carolina - Avenging Angels, the undergraduate programs being for women only
 Mid-American Christian University, Oklahoma City Oklahoma - Evangels, logo is a Legionary
 New Hope Christian College, Eugene, Oregon - Deacons (currently intramural sports only)
 North Carolina Wesleyan College, Rocky Mount, North Carolina - Battling Bishops
 Randall University, Moore, Oklahoma - Saints
 Wake Forest University, Winston-Salem, North Carolina - Wake Forest Demon Deacons, mascot the Demon Deacon

Name changes 
 Bloomfield College, Bloomfield, New Jersey - Deacons changed to the Bears in 2014
 Elon University, Elon, North Carolina - originally the Fightin’ Christians, changed to the Phoenix in 2000
 Evangel University, Springfield, Missouri - Crusaders removed in March 2021, replaced by the Valor.
 Lincoln Christian University, Lincoln, Illinois - Preachers (men) and Angels (women) changed to Red Lion in 2009
 Valparaiso University, Valparaiso, Indiana - Uhlans (1931-1942), Crusaders (1942-2021), now the Beacons

Protestant K-12 schools
 Christian Academy of Louisville, Louisville, Kentucky has four campuses, two of which are Centurions (logo is a soldier with a cross on his helmet) and one is Saints
 Christian Life Academy, Baton Rouge, Louisiana - Crusaders
 Shannon Forest Christian School, Greenville, South Carolina - Crusaders
 University Christian School, Jacksonville, Florida - Fighting Christians, mascot a Christian Knight

Quakers (Protestant) 
 Brooklyn Friends School, Brooklyn, New York
 Carolina Friends School, Durham, North Carolina
 Friends Academy, Locust Valley, New York
 Friends School of Baltimore, Baltimore, Maryland
 Moses Brown School, Providence, Rhode Island
 Sidwell Friends School, Bethesda, Maryland and Washington, D.C.
 William Penn Charter School, Philadelphia, Pennsylvania
 Wilmington Friends School, Wilmington, Delaware

Saints (Protestant)
 All Saints’ Episcopal School, Fort Worth, Texas
 All Saints Academy, Winter Haven, Florida - mascot is a St. Bernard dog
 Baytown Christian Academy, Baytown, Texas
 Briarcrest Christian School, Shelby County, Tennessee; the school was founded as a segregation academy in the 1970s 
 Calvary Academy, Springfield, Illinois
 Calvary Baptist Christian High School, San Fernando, California
 Christian Academy, Myrtle Beach, South Carolina
 Clarendon Hall School, Summerton, South Carolina
 Concordia Preparatory School, Towson, Maryland
 Faith Christian Academy, Pasadena, Texas
 Faith Christian School, Foreston, Minnesota
 Faith Heritage School, Syracuse, New York
 First Baptist Academy, Dallas, Texas
 Greenville Christian School, Greenville, Mississippi - founded as a segregation academy
 Harvest Christian Academy, Keller, Texas
 Hillcrest Christian School, Thousand Oaks, California
 Lutheran High School, Indianapolis, Indiana - mascot "Louis", a St. Bernard
 Lighthouse Christian Academy, Santa Monica, California
 Lima Christian School, Lima, New York 	
 Mountain View Christian School, Las Vegas, Nevada 
 Mt. Juliet Christian Academy, Mt. Juliet, Tennessee
 North Clackamas Christian School, Oregon City, Oregon
 Oklahoma Christian School, Edmond, Oklahoma
 Patrician Academy, Butler, Alabama
 Philadelphia Christian High School, Conyers, Georgia
 Prentiss Christian School, Prentiss, Mississippi
 Resurrection Christian School, Charlotte, North Carolina
 St. James School, Maryland, Hagerstown, Maryland
 St. Martin's Episcopal School, Metairie, Louisiana
 Saint Mary's School, Raleigh, North Carolina
 St. Paul's Episcopal School, Mobile, Alabama
 St. Paul's Lutheran School, Ocala, Florida
 St. Paul's Lutheran High School, Concordia, Missouri
 St. Stephen's & St. Agnes School, Alexandria, Virginia
 St. Thomas' Episcopal School, Houston, TexasSt. Paul's Episcopal School
 Seattle Lutheran High School, Seattle, Washington
 Shiloh Christian School, Springdale, Arkansas
 St. Andrew's School Barrington, Rhode Island
 St. Andrew's Episcopal School, Ridgeland, Mississippi
 St. Anne's-Belfield School, Charlottesville, Virginia
 St. Christopher's School, Richmond, Virginia
 St. Cloud Christian School, St. Cloud, Minnesota
 Sylva-Bay Academy, Bay Springs, Mississippi
 Trinity Episcopal Day School, Natchez, Mississippi
 Trinity Lutheran School, Bend, Oregon
 Trinity Preparatory School, Winter Park, FloridaSylva-Bay Academy
 Vail Christian High School, Edwards, Colorado

Other religions
 Yeshiva University, New York City - Maccabees

Private non-sectarian schools
 Converse University, Concordia, Missouri - Valkyries
 Dickinson College, Carlisle, Pennsylvania - Red Devils
 Fairleigh Dickinson University, Florham Park, New Jersey - Devils
 Flagler College, St. Augustine, Florida - Saints
 St. Lawrence University, Canton, New York - Saints (Founded by the Universalist Church of America, but now non-denominational)
 University of Pennsylvania, Philadelphia, Pennsylvania - The Penn Quakers name is more historical than religious
 University of the Sciences, Philadelphia, Pennsylvania - Devils, "Drake the Devil"

Public schools

Colleges and universities
 Arizona State University, Phoenix, Arizona - Sun Devils, mascot Sparky the Sun Devil
 California University of Pennsylvania, California, Pennsylvania - Vulcans
 Central Connecticut State, New Britain, Connecticut - Blue Devils
 Duke University, Durham, North Carolina - Blue Devils, derived from a French military unit in World War I.
 Lurleen B. Wallace Community College, Andalusia, Greenville, and Opp, Alabama - Saints
 Mission College, Santa Clara, California - Saints
 Mt. Hood Community College, Gresham, Oregon - Saints, St. Bernard mascot
 North Country Community College, Saranac Lake, New York - Saints, St. Bernard mascot
 Northwestern State University of Louisiana, Natchitoches, Louisiana - Demons, mascot Vic the Demon.
 San Diego Mesa College, San Diego, California - Olympians
 Santa Fe College, Gainesville, Florida - Saints, St. Bernard mascot
 Seward County Community College, Liberal, Kansas - Saints, mascot "Louie the Saint", crusader imagery
 Shawnee Community College, Ullin, Illinois - Saints, St. Bernard mascot

Secondary schools

Crusaders 
 Buhler High School, Buhler, Kansas
 Wellington High School, Wellington, Kansas

Deacons 
 St. Paul High School, St. Paul, Virginia - Deacons

Demons/Devils 
 Atkins High School,  Atkins, Arkansas - Red Devils
 Batavia High School, Batavia, New York - Blue Devils
 Brockport High School, Brockport, New York - Blue Devils
 Brunswick High School (Brunswick, Ohio), Brunswick, Ohio - Blue Devils
 Decatur Community High School, Oberlin, Kansas - Red Devils
 Española Valley High School, Española, New Mexico - Sundevils
 Franklin Central School, Franklin, Delaware County, New York - Purple Devils
 Kenmore West Senior High School, Kenmore, New York - Blue Devils
 Perkins-Tryon High School, Perkins, Oklahoma - Demons
 Plattsmouth High School, Plattsmouth, Nebraska - Blue Devils
 Port Barre High School, Port Barre, Louisiana - Red Devils
 Rancocas Valley Regional High School, Mount Holly, New Jersey - Red Devils
 Sedan, Kansas - Blue Devils
 Victor Senior High School, Victor, New York - Blue Devils
 Washington High School, Washington, Iowa - Demons
 Wayne High School, Wayne, Nebraska - Blue Devils
 Wynot Public Schools, Wynot, Nebraska - Blue Devils

Quakers 
 Eastern High School, Lansing, Michigan
 Franklin High School, Portland, Oregon - Changed from Quakers to Lightning in 2019
 Franklin High School, Seattle, Washington
 Horace Greeley High School, Chappaqua, New York
 Millville Area Junior Senior High School, Columbia County, Pennsylvania
 Moorestown High School, Moorestown, New Jersey
 New Philadelphia High School, New Philadelphia, Ohio
 Orchard Park High School, Orchard Park, New York
 Plainfield High School, Plainfield, Indiana
 Quaker Valley High School, Leetsdale, Pennsylvania
 Salem Junior/Senior High School, Salem, Ohio

Saints 
 Butterfield-Odin Public School, Butterfield, Minnesota
 Calhoun County High School, St. Matthews, South Carolina
 Cedar Grove High School, Ellenwood, Georgia
 Churchville-Chili High School, Churchville, New York
 Delta High School, Clarksburg, California
 Interlake High School, Bellevue, Washington
 Jefferson High School, Edgewater, Colorado
 La Salle High School, St. Ignace, Michigan			
 Locke High School, Los Angeles, California
 Melcher-Dallas High School, Melcher-Dallas, Iowa
 St. Ansgar High School, St. Ansgar, Iowa
 St. Charles High School, St. Charles, Minnesota
 St. Clair High School, East China Township, Michigan 				 			
 St. Croix Falls High School, St. Croix Falls, Wisconsin
 St. Helena High School, St. Helena, California
 St. James High School, St. James, Minnesota
 St. Michaels Middle/High School, St. Michaels, Maryland
 St. Paul High School, St. Paul, Arkansas
 Saint Peter High School, Saint Peter, Minnesota
 Saint Regis Falls Central School, Saint Regis Falls, New York
 San Dimas High School, San Dimas, California
 Sandalwood High School, Jacksonville, Florida
 Santa Ana High School, Santa Ana, California
 Santa Fe South High School, Oklahoma City, Oklahoma - mascot St. Bernard
 Santa Maria High School, Santa Maria, California
 Santa Teresa High School, San Jose, California
 Selma High School, Selma, Alabama
 Southern Wayne High School, Dudley, North Carolina	
 Thornwell Charter School, Clinton, South Carolina
 West Feliciana High School, St. Francisville, Louisiana

Valkyries 
Schools where the boy's teams are Vikings and the girl's teams are Valkyries, mythical figures in Norse mythology
Bigfork High School, Bigfork, Montana
Petersburg High School, Petersburg, Alaska

Professional sports teams and franchises
 Fort Myers Miracle, Minor League Baseball - became the Fort Myers Mighty Mussels in 2019
 Los Angeles Angels, Major League Baseball - Named after the city of Los Angeles
 New Jersey Devils, National Hockey League
 The Binghamton Devils became the Utica Comets when the team moved but remain affiliated with the New Jersey Devils.
 New Orleans Saints, National Football League - The franchise was named "the Saints" by popular vote on November 1, 1966—All Saint's Day. The name refers to the popular New Orleans gospel / jazz tune "When the Saints Go Marching In".
 Sacramento Kings, National Basketball Association - Mascot is Slamson the Lion, an allusion to the Old Testament figure Samson.
 San Antonio Missions, Minor League Baseball
 San Diego Padres, Major League Baseball - refers to the Franciscan friars who founded San Diego
 Stockton Thunder, ECHL - uses the Norse god Thor as mascot

Crusader mascot controversy
Many Catholic, and some Protestant schools adopted the Crusader for their teams. The University of the Incarnate Word decided in 2004 that its Crusader mascot was inappropriate for its multicultural mission. Corlis McGee, president of Eastern Nazarene College, said, "There's a growing awareness that the connotation of the word has changed, and the Crusader no longer represents the positive message of Christian love we want to share with the world."

Other universities have decided to keep the mascot as a way to honor their histories and constantly remind students to "communicate our desire to bring the good news and cross into every situation we encountered." The remaining college-level Crusaders are Belmont Abbey College (Belmont, North Carolina), Christendom College (Front Royal, Virginia), College of the Holy Cross (Worcester, Massachusetts), Madonna University (Livonia, Michigan), and North Greenville University (Tigerville, South Carolina) who changed their mascot from the Mounties to the Crusaders in 2017.

See also
Collegiate sport ritual in the United States
List of association football mascots
List of college sports team nicknames
List of mascots
List of sports team names and mascots derived from indigenous peoples
Native American mascot controversy

References

External links
MascotDB.com, a searchable database of sports mascots

Sports in the United States
Religious symbols
Religion and sports
Sports
Sports mascots in the United States
College mascots in the United States
High school sports in the United States
United S
Sports culture in the United States
College sports culture in the United States
Sports teams in the United States
College sports teams in the United States